Abdul Rahman Bin Mohammed Al Owais  (1967) is the minister of Ministry of Health in the United Arab Emirates. 

A graduate of the United Arab Emirates University, Al Owais attained a bachelor's degree in Accounting and Information. He then became the Minister of Culture, Youth and Community Development in 2006. Thereafter, Al Owais was appointed as Acting Minister of Health in 2011 and served until 2013. 

In 2013, Al Owais was appointed as Minister of Health. In this capacity, he was later appointed by WHO Director-General Tedros Adhanom Ghebreyesus to serve on the Independent High-level Commission on Non-Communicable Diseases from 2018 until 2019.

References

1967 births
Health ministers of the United Arab Emirates
Living people
United Arab Emirates University alumni